Lake Illawarra (Aboriginal Tharawal language: various adaptions of Elouera, Eloura, or Allowrie; Illa, Wurra, or Warra meaning pleasant place near the sea, or, high place near the sea, or, white clay mountain), is an open and trained intermediate wave dominated barrier estuary or large coastal lagoon , is located in the Illawarra region of New South Wales, situated about  south of Sydney, Australia.

In 2014, the LIA was replaced by the Lake Illawarra Estuary Management Committee (LIEMC), including representatives from Wollongong and Shellharbour City Councils, as well as independent scientific advisors, community members, and local Aboriginal representatives.

Location and features

The narrow tidal entrance to the Tasman Sea of the South Pacific Ocean is located at Windang. Before 2007 Lake Illawarra was frequently closed to the sea. The lake system received large amounts of nutrient and sediment from the catchment which tended to remain within the lake. Water levels within the lake also fluctuated greatly, affecting the local flora species. In July 2007 the Lake Illawarra Authority completed works on training the entrance of the lake to create a permanent opening to the sea. 

Located on the western shore of Lake Illawarra at Yallah is the natural gas-powered Tallawarra Power Station. The power station draws water from the lake for cooling purposes, and returns water to the lake via an onsite water management system that ensures water quality is maintained at levels above the catchment average.

The lake's location within the sprawling Wollongong urban area means that Lake Illawarra is vulnerable to pollution and urban run-off.

Recreation
Lake Illawarra is popular for recreational fishing, prawning and sailing. On 12 January 2009, it is suspected a man was bitten by a bull shark whilst snorkelling at Windang, near the mouth of Lake Illawarra.

Birds found at the lake include pelicans, cormorants, musk ducks, hoary-headed grebes, black swans, black ducks, grey teal ducks, herons, ibises and spoonbills.

History
The traditional custodians of the land surrounding what is now known as Lake Illawarra are the Aboriginal Tharawal and Wadi Wadi peoples. Lake Illawarra was a valuable source of food and spirituality. Burial sites and middens (shell and camp rubbish heaps) discovered at Windang and surrounding areas indicate that the Wadi Wadi used the area extensively and performed various corroborees and ceremonies in the area. The name Illawarra is derived from various adaptions of the Aboriginal Tharawal language words of elouera, eloura, or allowrie; illa, wurra, or warra mean generally a pleasant place near the sea, or high place near the sea, or white clay mountain.

Matthew Flinders and George Bass called the lake Tom Thumb's Lagoon on Flinders' chart, named after their little boat the Tom Thumb, when they were there in March 1796.

In Lake Illawarra: an ongoing history, Joseph Davis provides a wide-ranging environmental and historical biography of the lake and its foreshores. The book also contains many images and photographs depicting the lake. Davis edited John Brown of Brownsville: his manuscripts, letterbook and the records of Dapto Show Society 1857-1904 that deals with the man who did most to protect the vegetation of the lake islands, and he authored Gooseberry & Hooka: the island reserves of Lake Illawarra 1829-1947, the latter examining the records of John Brown and others and  deals with the history of these two islands and how they survived to become nature refuges rather than recreation reserves.

See also

 List of lakes of Australia
 Lake Illawarra High School

References

External links

 
 Lake Illawarra Authority*  

Illawarra
Geography of Wollongong
Illawarra, Lake
City of Shellharbour
Tourist attractions in Wollongong